Mahjouba, Morocco is a town in Morocco, North Africa, located at 34°48'36"N and 2°34'48"W

The town was also  the seat of an ancient Christian bishopric, which although  ceasing to function with the Muslim conquest of the Maghreb, survives today as a titular see of the Roman Catholic Church.

See also
Mahjouba, Tunisia

References

Roman towns and cities in Morocco
Archaeological sites in Tunisia
Catholic titular sees in Africa
Mauretania Tingitana